Stévy Nzambé (born 1991) is a Gabonese professional footballer who plays as a left back for Ittihad Tanger of Morocco. He also plays for the Gabon national football team. He previously played domestically for USM Libreville, US Bitam, AS Mangasport and AS Pélican, spent time with French clubs Troyes and Marseille at junior level, and appeared for AmaZulu and Real Kings of South Africa, Swazi club Mbabane Swallows and Al-Zawraa of Iraq.

Career
He has competed at the 2012 Summer Olympics.

Competing for AmaZulu, Nzambe suffered a fractured skull when he collided with a Real Kings player, placing him in an intensive care unit for some months and having deleterious effects on his health.

References

External links
 AmaZulu's Stevy Nzambe back from fractured skull
 AmaZulu’s Gabonese defender in ICU
 Stevy Nzambe itching for action

1991 births
Living people
Gabonese footballers
Gabon international footballers
Association football defenders
Olympic footballers of Gabon
USM Libreville players
US Bitam players
ES Troyes AC players
Olympique de Marseille players
AS Mangasport players
AS Pélican players
AmaZulu F.C. players
Real Kings F.C. players
Mbabane Swallows players
Ittihad Tanger players
Footballers at the 2012 Summer Olympics
Gabonese expatriate footballers
Expatriate footballers in France
Expatriate soccer players in South Africa
Expatriate footballers in Eswatini
Expatriate footballers in Morocco
Expatriate footballers in Iraq
21st-century Gabonese people
2016 African Nations Championship players
Gabon A' international footballers